Digital mobile radio (DMR) is a specification for commercial products so they can interoperate. It is defined by a standard created by the European Telecommunications Standards Institute (ETSI), and is designed to be low-cost and easy to use. DMR, along with P25 phase II and NXDN are the main competitor technologies in achieving 6.25 kHz equivalent bandwidth using the proprietary AMBE+2 vocoder. DMR and P25 II both use two-slot TDMA in a 12.5 kHz channel, while NXDN uses discrete 6.25 kHz channels using frequency division and TETRA uses a  four-slot TDMA in a 25 kHz channel. 

DMR was designed with three tiers. DMR tiers I and II (conventional) were first published in 2005, and DMR III (Trunked version) was published in 2012, with manufacturers producing products within a few years of each publication.

The primary goal of the standard is to specify a digital system with low complexity, low cost and interoperability across brands, so radio communications purchasers are not locked into a proprietary solution. In practice, given the current limited scope of the DMR standard, many vendors have introduced proprietary features that make their product offerings non-interoperable with other brands.

Specifications

The DMR interface is defined by the following ETSI standards:
TS 102 361-1: Air interface protocol
TS 102 361-2: Voice and General services and facilities
TS 102 361-3: Data protocol
TS 102 361-4: Trunking protocol

The DMR standard operates within the existing 12.5 kHz channel spacing used in land mobile frequency bands globally, but achieves two voice channels through two-slot TDMA technology built around a 30 ms structure. The modulation is 4-state FSK, which creates four possible symbols over the air at a rate of 4,800 symbols/s, corresponding to 9,600 bit/s. After overhead, forward error correction, and splitting into two channels, there is 2,450 bit/s left for a single voice channel using DMR, compared to 4,400 bit/s using P25 and 64,000 bit/s with traditional telephone circuits.

The standards are still (as of late 2015) under development with revisions being made regularly as more systems are deployed and improvements are discovered. It is very likely that further refinements will be made to the standard, which will necessitate firmware upgrades to terminals and infrastructure in the future to take advantage of these new improvements, with potential incompatibility issues arising if this is not done.

DMR covers the RF range 30 MHz to 1 GHz.
 
There are DMR implementations, (as of early 2016), that operate as low as 66 MHz (within the European Union, in 'Lo-Band VHF' 66–88 MHz.) 

The DMR Association and manufacturers often claim that DMR has superior coverage performance to analogue FM. Forward error correction can achieve a higher quality of voice when the receive signal is still relatively high. In practice, however, digital modulation protocols are much more susceptible to multipath interference and fail to provide service in areas where analogue FM would otherwise provide degraded but audible voice service. At a higher quality of voice, DMR outperforms analogue FM by about 11 dB. But at a lower quality of voice, analogue FM outperforms DMR by about 5 dB.

Where digital signal processing has been used to enhance the analogue FM audio quality then analogue FM generally outperforms DMR in all situations, with a typical 2–3 dB improvement for "high quality" voice and around 5 dB improvement for "lower quality" voice. Where digital signal processing is used to enhance analog FM audio, the overall "delivered audio quality" is also considerably better than DMR. However DSP processing of analog FM audio does not remove the 12.5 kHz requirement so DMR is still more spectrally efficient.

DMR Tiers

DMR Tier I 

DMR Tier I products are for licence-free use in the European PMR446 band. Tier I products are specified for non-infrastructure use only (meaning without the use of repeaters). This part of the standard provides for consumer applications and low-power commercial applications, using a maximum of 0.5 watt RF power.

Note that a licence free allocation is not present at this frequency outside of Europe, which means that PMR446 radios including DMR Tier I radios can only be used legally in other countries once an appropriate radio licence is obtained by the operator.

Some DMR radios sold by Chinese manufacturers (most notably Baofeng) have been mis-labelled as DMR Tier I. A DMR Tier I radio would only use the PMR446 licence free frequencies, and would have a maximum transmitted power of 0.5 W as required by law for all PMR446 radios.

Although the DMR standard allows Tier I DMR radios to use continuous transmission mode, all known Tier I radios currently use TDMA, the same as Tier II. This is probably due to the battery savings that come with transmitting only half the time instead of continuously.

DMR Tier II 

DMR Tier II covers licensed conventional radio systems, mobiles and hand portables operating in PMR frequency bands from 66–960 MHz.
The ETSI DMR Tier II standard is targeted at those users who need spectral efficiency, advanced voice features and integrated IP data services in licensed bands for high-power communications. A number of manufacturers have DMR Tier II compliant products on the market. ETSI DMR specifies two slot TDMA in 12.5 kHz channels for Tier II and III.

DMR Tier III 

DMR Tier III covers trunking operation in frequency bands 66–960 MHz. Tier III supports voice and short messaging handling similar to TETRA with built-in 128 character status messaging and short messaging with up to 288 bits of data in a variety of formats.  It also supports packet data service in a variety of formats, including support for IPv4 and IPv6. Tier III compliant products were launched in 2012. In April 2013, Hytera participated in the completion of the DMR Tier III interoperability (IOP) test.

DMR Association

In 2005, a memorandum of understanding (MOU) was formed with potential DMR suppliers including Tait Communications, Fylde Micro, Selex, Motorola, Hytera, Sanchar Communication, Vertex Standard, Kenwood and Icom to establish common standards and interoperability.  While the DMR standard does not specify the vocoder, MOU members agreed to use the half rate DVSI Advanced Multi-Band Excitation (AMBE) vocoder to ensure interoperability. In 2009, the MOU members set up the DMR Association to work on interoperability between vendors' equipment and to provide information about the DMR standard. Formal interoperability testing has been taking place since 2010. Results are published on the DMR Association web site. There are approximately 40 members of the DMR Association.

The standard allows DMR manufacturers to implement additional features on top of the standards which has led to practical non-interoperability issues between brands, in contravention to the DMR MOU.

Amateur radio use 
DMR is used on the amateur radio VHF and UHF bands, started by DMR-MARC around 2010. The FCC officially approved the use of DMR by amateurs in 2014. In amateur spaces, Coordinated DMR Identification Numbers are assigned and managed by RadioID Inc. Their coordinated database can be uploaded to DMR radios in order to display the name, call sign, and location of other operators. Internet-linked systems such as DMR-MARC, FreeSTAR (an experimental multi mode network which has connections with numerous digital & analogue systems), BrandMeister network, TGIF, DV Scotland - Phoenix UK (the two networks merged in late 2022), FreeDMR and several others (including several previously closed clusters which now connect to larger networks to wide area accessibility), allow users to communicate with other users around the world via connected repeaters, or DMR "hotspots" often based on the Raspberry Pi single-board computer. There are currently more than 5,500 repeaters and 16,000 "hotspots" linked to the BrandMeister system worldwide. The low-cost and increasing availability of internet-linked systems have led to a rise in DMR use on the amateur radio bands. The development of Raspberry Pi-based hotspots, often those using the Pi-Star software, has allowed users to connect their radios to one or more internet-linked systems at the same time. DMR hotspots are often based on the open source Multimode Digital Voice Modem, or MMDVM, hardware with firmware developed by Jonathan Naylor.

See also
dPMR

References

External links
 DMR Association
 MNDMR - Minnesota's First In-House DMR Repeater Network System

Wireless communication systems
Mobile telecommunications standards